Mohamed Ibrahim Diaby (born April 2, 1990) is an Ivorian football midfielder. He currently plays for USC Bassam in the Côte d'Ivoire Premier Division. In 2009, he played for FC Shinnik Yaroslavl in the Russian First Division.

Career
Diaby made his debut for FC Shinnik on 24 June 2009 as a late substitute against FC Baltika Kaliningrad.

After leaving Shinnik, he returned to Bassam in 2010.

As of 2015, he's still on the books of USC Bassam.

References

External links
 Profile at the official FC Shinnik Yaroslavl website
 http://www.fif-ci.com/CI/Player-284-119-1009.do

Ivorian footballers
Ivorian expatriate footballers
FC Shinnik Yaroslavl players
Expatriate footballers in Russia
1990 births
Living people
Association football midfielders